The 2002 Gael Linn Cup, the most important representative competition for elite level participants in the women's team field sport of camogie, was won by Munster, who defeated Ulster in the final, played at Bohernabreena.

Arrangements
Ulster defeated Connacht 3–14 to 2–16. Captained by Tipperary centre-half back Ciara Gaynor, Munster defeated Leinster 5–13 to 1–10. Munster defeated Ulster by 7–23 to 0–11 in the final.

Final stages

|}

Junior Final

|}

References

External links
 Camogie Association

2002 in camogie
2002